The Penchala River is a river in Selangor, Malaysia. It runs from Kampung Sungai Penchala to Klang River near Petaling Jaya.

See also
 List of rivers of Malaysia

Rivers of Selangor
Nature sites of Selangor
Rivers of Malaysia